Charles Richard Morin (October 30, 1870 – July 4, 1947), sometimes referred to as Charley Morin, was an American professional carom billiards player.

Biography
On January 5, 1914 in Chicago, Morin challenged the defending champion, Cuban Alfredo de Oro who was then residing in New York, for the national Jordan Lambert Trophy three-cushion title. Morin was defeated after 75 innings in the first match, and the next day lost the second match to the incumbent as well, 39–50.

He played de Oro again at the 1915 World Championship, but lost, although he did score the highest  in the tournament. He died on July 4, 1947 in Wilmette, Illinois.

References

1870 births
1947 deaths
Three-cushion billiards players
American carom billiards players
World champions in carom billiards
Sportspeople from Chicago